Saros cycle series 143 for solar eclipses occurs at the Moon's ascending node, repeating every 18 years and 11 days, containing 72 events. It consisted of 10 partial eclipses, 12 total eclipses, 4 hybrid events, 26 annular eclipses, and ends with 20 partial eclipses. The longest total eclipse of the series was in 1887 at 3 minutes and 50 seconds. All eclipses in this series occurs at the Moon's ascending node.

This solar saros is linked to Lunar Saros 136.

Umbral eclipses
Umbral eclipses (annular, total and hybrid) can be further classified as either: 1) Central (two limits), 2) Central (one limit) or 3) Non-Central (one limit). The statistical distribution of these classes in Saros series 143 appears in the following table.

Events

References 
 http://eclipse.gsfc.nasa.gov/SEsaros/SEsaros143.html

External links
Saros cycle 13 - Information and visualization

Solar saros series